The 2016 NCAA Division II men's basketball tournament involved 64 teams playing in a single-elimination tournament to determine the national champion of men's NCAA Division II college basketball. It began in March 2016, following the 2015–16 season, and concluded with the championship game on March 26, 2016.

The eight regional winners met in the Elite Eight for the quarterfinal, semifinal, and championship rounds. For the first time, the final rounds were held at Dr. Pepper Arena in Frisco, Texas.

Augustana (SD) defeated Lincoln Memorial, 90-81, to win the first national championship in the school's history. Lubbock Christian, Saginaw Valley State and St. Thomas Aquinas all made their first Division II tournament appearance. All won their first tournament game, and Saginaw Valley advanced to the Elite Eight. At the same time, Kentucky Wesleyan made its 38th appearance, Philadelphia its 35th, and Seattle Pacific its 26th, but all lost their opening round game.

Regionals

Southeast - Harrogate, Tennessee
Location: Tex Turner Arena Host: Lincoln Memorial University

South - Huntsville, Alabama
Location: Spragins Hall Host: University of Alabama in Huntsville

Atlantic - Wheeling, West Virginia
Location: Alma Grace McDonough Center Host: Wheeling Jesuit University

East - Philadelphia, Pennsylvania
Location: Campus Center Gymnasium Host: Holy Family University

Central - Sioux Falls, South Dakota
Location: Sanford Pentagon Host: Augustana University

South Central - Wichita Falls, Texas
Location: D.L. Ligon Coliseum Host: Midwestern State University

West - Monmouth, Oregon
Location: New P.E. Building Host: Western Oregon University

Midwest - Somers, Wisconsin
Location: DeSimone Gymnasium Host: University of Wisconsin, Parkside

Elite Eight - Frisco, Texas
Location: Dr Pepper Arena Host: Lone Star Conference

Beginning this year, the eight regional champions were re-seeded into the Elite Eight.

All-tournament team
 Seger Bonifant (West Liberty)
 Daniel Jansen (Augustana (SD))
 Alex Richter (Augustana (SD))
 Casey Schilling (Augustana (SD))
 Gerel Simmons (Lincoln Memorial)

References
 2016 NCAA Division II men's basketball tournament jonfmorse.com

NCAA Division II men's basketball tournament
Tournament
NCAA Division II basketball tournament
NCAA Division II basketball tournament
Basketball in Wichita Falls, Texas
Basketball in the Dallas–Fort Worth metroplex